Ted Bami Minsende (born 2 March 1978 in Zaire (now Democratic Republic of the Congo)) is a former professional boxer. Nicknamed "Dangerous", Bami is a former European light welterweight champion and British light welterweight title challenger. He was until recently the trainer of his nephew, British boxer Isaac Chamberlain. Bami and Chamberlain parted ways following Chamberlain's accusations of theft; however, in May 2018, the Boxing Board of Control cleared Bami of all accusations and he remained Chamberlain's Manager until 2020.

Biography
Bami was born in Zaire (now Democratic Republic of the Congo) but has lived in Britain since the age of 12, having left Zaire to avoid the civil war in the country at that time. He was raised by his uncle who first introduced him to boxing at 15. Bami is self-managed and is trained by James Cook.

Professional career
Bami made his professional boxing debut in September 1998, with a first round stoppage of Des Sowden. In his second professional fight, Bami knocked out Gary Reid in the 2nd round of a scheduled 4 round contest. Reid would go on to challenge for the commonwealth light welterweight title. Bami's first setback came when he was knocked out by Jacek Bielski in his fourth fight.

Rise to prominence
On 17 August 2002, Bami knocked out the previously undefeated Bradley Pryce in the 6th round. Pryce has since gone on to challenge for the British welterweight title and win the Commonwealth title in the light middleweight division.

In April, 2003, Bami won the vacant World Boxing Federation (WBF) light welterweight title with a 9th round knockout of Vasile 'Laszlo' Herteg. On 26 July 2003, in his first defence of the title, Bami was knocked out by South African Samuel Malinga, who had previously defeated Colin Lynes.

Following the defeat to Malinga, Bami spent the next couple of years fighting mid-level European opposition. During this period his biggest wins were over Hungarian Jozsef Matolcsi, Russian Viktor Baranov and Poland's Rafal Jackiewicz.

European title
On 14 September 2006, following an injury to Jason Cook, Bami received a late call to fight for the vacant European light welterweight title against Italian Giuseppe Lauri, who had previously lost against Ricky Hatton and Junior Witter. On 22 September 2006, despite having a point deducted for headbutting, Bami defeated Lauri via a unanimous points decision with scores of 117-112 twice and 118-111.

On 30 March 2007, Bami scored another unanimous points decision over Lauri in a rematch for the title. Bami vacated the title following an injury.

British title
On 14 March 2008, Bami challenged David Barnes for the vacant British light welterweight title. Bami was defeated via a unanimous points decision, in a fight which Barnes controlled with his jab.  In July, 2008, Bami returned to winning ways with a 7th round knockout of Stuart Elwell via a body shot.

Prizefighter 3: The Welterweights
On 24 October 2008, Bami was defeated in the final of the 3rd Prizefighter tournament by Michael Lomax. Bami, favourite going into the tournament, defeated Andrew Ferrans via knockout and Mark Lloyd on points on his way to the final.

Bami vs. Hatton
On 28 March 2009, Bami was defeated by Matthew Hatton in a 6th round stoppage in an eliminator for the IBO welterweight Title. After the fight, Bami announced that he would continue with his boxing career stating "People now think Ted Bami is over but I’m not over."

Championships held
 European Light Welterweight title
 WBF Light Welterweight title

References

External links

1978 births
Living people
Light-welterweight boxers
Prizefighter contestants
Democratic Republic of the Congo male boxers
Democratic Republic of the Congo emigrants to the United Kingdom
British male boxers